Ibrahim Sabry is an Egyptian archer who participated at the 2010 Summer Youth Olympics in Singapore. He won the gold medal in the boys' event, defeating Rick van den Oever of the Netherlands in the final.

References 

Archers at the 2010 Summer Youth Olympics
Living people
Egyptian male archers
Mediterranean Games gold medalists for Egypt
Competitors at the 2013 Mediterranean Games
Mediterranean Games medalists in archery
Year of birth missing (living people)
Youth Olympic gold medalists for Egypt
21st-century Egyptian people